Jessica Lorene Smith (born October 11, 1989 in Vancouver, British Columbia) is a Canadian track and field athlete who specialises in the 800 metres. She competed in the 800m event at the 2012 Summer Olympics, but was eliminated at the semi-final stage.  Smith also participated in the 800m event at the 2015 Pan American Games where she finished in 5th place.

Achievements
 1st, Vancouver Sun Harry Jerome Track Classic, Burnaby, Canada (Olympic 'A' Standard).
 Personal Best: 1:59:86; Burnaby, CAN 10/06/2012

References

1989 births
Living people
Olympic track and field athletes of Canada
Athletes from Vancouver
Athletes (track and field) at the 2012 Summer Olympics
Canadian female middle-distance runners
Commonwealth Games competitors for Canada
Athletes (track and field) at the 2014 Commonwealth Games
Athletes (track and field) at the 2015 Pan American Games
Pan American Games track and field athletes for Canada